Burchard was Bishop of Utrecht between 1100 and 1112. He was dean in Strasbourg before he was appointed as bishop by Emperor Henry IV in 1100. He supported the Emperor during the investiture controversy but he did not play a major part in it. He gave Count Floris II of West Frisia, the title Count of Holland in 1101.

Burchard was interred in the Cathedral of Saint Martin, Utrecht.

References

12th-century Roman Catholic bishops in the Holy Roman Empire
Prince-Bishops of Utrecht
Burials at St. Martin's Cathedral, Utrecht
1112 deaths